Neridup Land District is a land district (cadastral division) of Western Australia, located within the Eucla Land Division on the state's south coast. It spans roughly 33°15'S - 34°00'S in latitude and 122°20'E - 123°30'E in longitude.

Location and features
It includes the townsites of Condingup (1963) and Wharton (1964).

History
On 20 August 1896, Harry Johnston, the Deputy Surveyor General of Western Australia, recommended that four new districts be created in the Esperance region, suggesting the name "Cheyne" for Neridup. The Minister approved the names on 11 September, and on 23 September 1896 they were added to the Standard Plans in use by the Department of Lands and Surveys. As it was approved prior to the Land Act 1898, its boundaries were never gazetted.

References

Land districts of Western Australia
Goldfields-Esperance